Ozutochi World Tour was the fifth concert tour by Latin musician Ozuna, to promote his fifth studio album Ozutochi. The tour began on June 30, 2022, and concluded on December 9, 2022. The tour consisted on two legs and 37 concerts, which included several presentations on summer festivals in Europe, visiting countries such as Switzerland, Holland, Luxembourg, France, Italy, and Spain and an arena tour in the United States.

The first leg on Europe began on June 30, 2022, in Seville, Spain and ended on July 31, 2022, in Ibiza, Spain. The second leg consisted of 24 dates in arenas beginning with the Barclays Center in Brooklyn, New York on September 30. Much of the itinerary is centered in Texas and California with a total of 13 shows taking place between the two U.S. states. The US leg is set to conclude in Miami on December 9 in the United States.

Background 
Following the release of his third studio album, Nibiru, Ozuna planned to do his third concert tour 2020 Nibiru World Tour. However, it was cancelled due to the COVID-19 pandemic. Following that, he released his fourth album, ENOC, in 2020 and the Anuel AA collab "Los Dioses" a year later. In early 2022, released a duet with Christina Aguilera and the singles Deprimida," “G-Wagon" and "Apretatio. On May 23, 2022, the dates of his world tour were announced through his social media and tickets were available for sale two days later.

Tour dates

Cancelled concerts

Notes

References 

Ozuna (singer)
2022 concert tours
Concert tours of Europe
Concert tours of North America
Concert tours postponed due to the COVID-19 pandemic